Best Mart 360 is a chain store in Hong Kong that sells snacks. The company operates 103 stores as of January 2019.

Best Mart 360 was founded in 2013, with its first store in Sheung Shui. It initially targeted tourists, though it has also started to cater to Hong Kong residents following a decline in tourists visiting Hong Kong in 2016. Its main competitor is 759 Store. The company was listed on the Hong Kong Stock Exchange in January 2019.

The Securities and Futures Commission completed an enquiry into the shareholding of Best Mart 360 in June 2019, finding that Best Mart 360 had a high concentration of shareholding. The SFC warned shareholders to exercise extreme caution when dealing in the shares of the company, noting that the price of the shares could fluctuate substantially even with only a small number of shares traded.

Best Mart 360 was one of the main targets to be vandalised during 2019–2020 Hong Kong protests because it was accused of having ties to "Fujian gangs" that clashed with anti-government demonstrators. In response, the company decided to shift focus to Mainland Chinese market to reduce dependence on Hong Kong market, including the plan to open 15 to 20 stores in Macanese market within two years, while denying that the company has connection with Fujian gangs. Despite the damages caused by the demonstrators, the company decided to keep operating the 72 damaged stores out of total 102 stores in Hong Kong.

The first store in Macau was opened on 17 December 2019, while additional 2 stores which the company had rented will be open on an unspecified date.

References

External links
 
 

2013 establishments in Hong Kong
Retail companies established in 2013
Food and drink companies of Hong Kong
Retail companies of Hong Kong
Companies listed on the Hong Kong Stock Exchange
2019–2020 Hong Kong protests